TerraLib is an open-source GIS software library that extends object-relational DBMS technology to handle spatiotemporal data types. The library  supports different DBMS, including MySQL, PostgreSQL, and Oracle. Its vector data model is upwards compliant with OGC standards. TerraLib supports the development of geographical applications using spatial databases.

The design goal for TerraLib is to support large-scale applications using socioeconomic and environmental data. It handles spatiotemporal data types (events, moving objects, cell spaces, modifiable objects) and allows spatial, temporal and attribute queries on the database. TerraLib supports dynamic modelling in generalized cell spaces and has a dynamic link with the R programming language for statistical analysis. It handles large image data sets. TerraLib is implemented as a library of C++ classes and functions, written in ANSI-C++, and has programming interfaces in Java and Visual Basic.

TerraLib has a core development team based in Brazil. The team includes the Image Processing Division of Brazil's National Institute for Space Research, and the Computer Graphics Technology Group of the Pontifical Catholic University of Rio de Janeiro. TerraLib is licensed as open-source according to the LGPL.

Using TerraLib, the INPE team developed the TerraView open-source GIS, which provides functions for data conversion, visualization, exploratory spatial data analysis, spatial statistical modelling  and spatial and non-spatial queries. Another application is TerraAmazon, Brazil's national database for monitoring deforestation in the Amazon Rainforest. It handles more than 2 million complex polygons and 60 GB of remote sensing images.

See also

Further reading

External links 
 

Free GIS software
Free computer libraries